Grammothele venezuelica is a poroid crust fungi in the family Polyporaceae. Found in Venezuela, it was described as new to science in 2015 by Norwegian mycologist Leif Ryvarden. The holotype collection was made in Estado Aruga, Choroní, where the fungus was discovered growing on hardwood.

References

venezuelica
Fungi described in 2015
Fungi of Venezuela
Taxa named by Leif Ryvarden